The Franklin Exchange Building is a 280 ft (85m) high rise in Tampa, Florida. It was completed in 1966 and has 22 floors. At the time of its completion, it was the tallest building in Tampa. It is now the 14th tallest. It is at 655 North Franklin Street. It was renovated in 2013. The complex includes the tower, annex, and vault.

The Franklin Exchange Building is also notable in the history of the Wikimedia Foundation; it was the site of the first WMF colocation facility.

See also
List of tallest buildings in Tampa

References

Skyscraper office buildings in Tampa, Florida
1966 establishments in Florida
Office buildings completed in 1966